The Windsors: Endgame is a play by George Jeffrie and Bert Tyler-Moore based on their Channel 4 sitcom The Windsors. It is a parody of the British royal family, the House of Windsor.

Production history 
The play is directed by Michael Fentiman and was written by Bert Tyler-Moore and the late comedy writer George Jeffrie, who died on 19 September 2020 after writing the first draft of the script. The live show stars Harry Enfield, who reprises the role of the Charles from the TV sitcom, a character who is now seen in the production as the King. 

On 24 June 2021, further casting was announced with Matthew Cottle, Tom-Durrant Pritchard and Tim Wallers (who also appeared in the sitcom) joining Enfield on stage.

The play opened at the Prince of Wales Theatre in London's West End on 2 August and is expected to run until 9 October 2021.

Reviews 
Arifa Akbar in The Guardian gave The Windsors: Endgame a one star review and said that the spin-off was "akin to seeing Sex and the City: The Movie" with her high expectation "met by crashing disappointment", while the two star review in The Telegraph by Clive Davis stated that the play failed "to make use of its prime asset, Harry Enfield".

Cast and characters

References

External links 
 Official website

2021 plays
British plays
Plays based on television series
Cultural depictions of Charles III
Cultural depictions of the British Royal Family